Max van Beurden (25 December 1930 – 28 October 2006) was a Dutch footballer. He played in five matches for the Netherlands national football team from 1953 to 1954.

References

External links
 

1930 births
2006 deaths
Dutch footballers
Netherlands international footballers
Footballers from North Brabant
Association football forwards